Karen Emma Pollock  is a British writer, activist and chief executive of the Holocaust Educational Trust (HET).

Early life
Pollock was politically active while at university, engaging with the National Union of Students and the Union of Jewish Students.

Career
She was Director of the All-Party Parliamentary Group against Antisemitism.

She later joined the Holocaust Educational Trust (HET) in 1998 as Director of Communications. Pollock was promoted to chief executive of the organisation in 2000. One campaign led by Pollock was asking the government to recognise British people who had saved Jewish lives during the Holocaust. Pollock was praised by politicians across the spectrum for 'Lessons from Auschwitz', a program that has enabled thousands of sixth form and university students to visit Auschwitz concentration camp.

Alongside HET, she is involved with the anti-fascist organisation Searchlight and the London Jewish Forum, as well as the Holocaust Memorial Day Trust of which she was a founding trustee.

She has written for The Guardian, Jewish News, The Jewish Chronicle, and The Huffington Post and gave a TED talk entitled 'The search for humanity in the Holocaust' for TEDxDurhamUniversity 2016.

She represented British Jews at the United Nations World Conference against Racism in 2001 and 2009.

She is a vice-president of the Jewish Leadership Council.

She was appointed Member of the Order of the British Empire (MBE) in the 2012 New Year Honours for services to education, specifically about the Holocaust, and Commander of the Order of the British Empire (CBE) in the 2020 Birthday Honours for services to Holocaust education.

References 

The Holocaust and the United Kingdom
21st-century British writers
21st-century British women writers
Year of birth missing (living people)
Living people
Commanders of the Order of the British Empire